Ralph Britt (born August 18, 1965) is a former American football player who played for the Pittsburgh Steelers of the National Football League. He played college football at North Carolina State University.

References

1965 births
Living people
American football tight ends
NC State Wolfpack football players
Pittsburgh Steelers players
Players of American football from North Carolina
People from Rose Hill, North Carolina
National Football League replacement players